Vichitra Vanitha is a 1947 Indian Tamil-language film produced and directed by Krishnaswami Subrahmanyam. The film stars B. S. Saroja and S. Krishnaswamy.

Plot
The story tells the fun and misunderstanding between people due to mistaken identities. The main character being a woman attempting to attract the attention of a young rich man whom she falls in love with.

Cast
The list is compiled from the database of Film News Anandan and from the review article in the Hindu newspaper.
B. S. Saroja
Chitra S. Krishnaswami
P. A. Periyanayaki
Pulimoottai Ramaswami
K. S. Angamuthu
K. Kumaraswami
K. S. Mani
K. Lakshmikantham
A. M. Somasundaram

Production
The film was produced by Krishnaswami Subrahmanyam who also directed it. Part of film was made at Chitrakala Movietone, a studio situated at Thiruparankundram on the outskirts of Madurai. The rest was done at Neptune Studio in Madras. P. A. Periyanayaki, who was a popular singing star of the time, featured in a supportive role.

The story was based on the English play She Stoops to Conquer by Oliver Goldsmith.

Soundtrack
Music was composed by Brother Lakshmanan (who also wrote the screenplay and dialogues). The film had many patriotic songs. P. A. Periyanayaki sang a number of songs.

Reception
The film was a success at the box office. It is remembered well for the comedy and performance by B. S. Saroja and Pulimoottai Ramasami.

References

1947 comedy-drama films
1947 films
Indian comedy-drama films
Indian black-and-white films
Indian films based on plays
1940s Tamil-language films
Films directed by K. Subramanyam
Films scored by Br Lakshmanan